Pucov is a village and municipality in Dolný Kubín District in the Zilina Region of northern Slovakia. It is situated at 579 m (1900 ft) and has about 739 inhabitants.

References

External links
  Pucov Village website (in Slovak)

Villages and municipalities in Dolný Kubín District